Trifunctional purine biosynthetic protein adenosine-3 is an enzyme that in humans is encoded by the GART gene.

This protein is a trifunctional polypeptide. It has Phosphoribosylamine—glycine ligase (EC 6.3.4.13), Phosphoribosylglycinamide formyltransferase (EC 2.1.2.2), AIR synthetase (FGAM cyclase)  (EC 6.3.3.1) activity which is required for de novo purine biosynthesis.

References

Further reading

External links